MOSIS (Metal Oxide Semiconductor Implementation Service) is multi-project wafer service that provides metal–oxide–semiconductor (MOS) chip design tools and related services that enable universities, government agencies, research institutes and businesses to prototype chips efficiently and cost-effectively.

Operated by the University of Southern California's Information Sciences Institute (ISI), MOSIS combines customers' orders onto shared multi-project wafers that speed production and reduce costs compared with underutilized single-project wafers. Customers are able to debug and adjust designs, or to commission small-volume runs, without making major production investments. Fabrication costs are also shared by combining multiple designs from a single customer onto one "mask set," or wafer template. According to MOSIS, the service has delivered more than 60,000 integrated circuit designs.

MOSIS was created in 1981 by ISI's Danny Cohen, an Internet pioneer who also developed Voice over Internet Protocol and Video over Internet Protocol. It was based on the revolutionary VLSI design methodology of Carver Mead and Lynn Conway, who pioneered and/or popularized the use of technology-independent design rules and modular cell-based, hierarchical system design, testing this new approach to rapid prototyping and short-run fabrication at Xerox PARC. One of the first e-commerce providers, MOSIS also launched the "fabless foundry" industry, in which vendors outsource chip fabrication rather than manufacturing them in-house. Thousands of students also have learned chip design in MOSIS-associate programs.

Many early MOSIS users were students trying IC layout techniques from the seminal book  Introduction to VLSI Design published in 1980 by Caltech professor Carver Mead and MIT professor Lynn Conway. Some early reduced instruction set computing (RISC) processors such as MIPS (1984) and SPARC (1987) were run through MOSIS during their early design and testing phases.

See also 
 Mead and Conway revolution

References

External links 
 MOSIS web site
 foveon.com - Foveon - Executive Profiles (archived from 2005)

Integrated circuits
Semiconductor device fabrication